La Noche del 10 was an Argentine television show hosted by football player Diego Maradona, which aired for one season in 2005.

History
On 15 August 2005, Maradona made his debut as host with Pelé as his main guest on opening night; the two had a friendly chat, showing no signs of past differences. 

In subsequent evenings, he led the ratings on all occasions but one. Most guests were drawn from the worlds of football and show business, including Ronaldo and Zinedine Zidane, but also included interviews with other notable friends and personalities such as Cuban leader Fidel Castro and boxers Roberto Durán and Mike Tyson.

Maradona gave each of his guests a signed Argentina jersey, which Tyson wore when he arrived in Brazil, Argentina's rivals in football. 

12 episodes aired during its run.

References

External links
 

Argentine television talk shows
2005 Argentine television series debuts
Diego Maradona